Gopichand Lagadapati is an Indian actor, writer, director and producer. He made his acting debut in the Telugu film Anand, directed by Sekhar Kammula, and debuted as a producer on the film Mr. Medhavi.

Early life 
Lagadapati was born in India. His father, Sangaiah Lagadapati, is a Telugu professor. Lagadapati did his graduation in Hotel Management from a college affiliated with Osmania University, Hyderabad. His maternal grandfather Ramarao Bodduluri is a former Member of the Andhra Pradesh Legislature from Jaggayyapet constituency.

Career 

Lagadapati's first film as a lead actor is Rendella Tharuvatha, which received mixed responses and was a commercial failure at the box office. He next appeared in an Indian English film, On the Other Side which was released in US. The film was released with the name Indian Beauty in Telugu.

In 2007, Lagadapati produced his first film, Mr. Medhavi in 2007, released in 2008. The film was critically acclaimed but remained a commercial failure at the box office.

Filmography

Films

Television shows

References

External links 

Indian male film actors
Living people
21st-century Indian male actors
1981 births
Telugu film directors
Indian television directors
Indian male screenwriters
Male actors in Telugu cinema
Telugu film producers